Akoya akoya is a species of sea snail, a marine gastropod mollusk, in the family Calliostomatidae within the superfamily Trochoidea, the top snails, turban snails and their allies.

Distribution
This species occurs in Japan.

References

Calliostomatidae
Gastropods described in 1942